The Banka–Rajendra Nagar Intercity Express is an Express train belonging to East Central Railway zone that runs between  and  in India. It is currently being operated with 13241/13242 train numbers on six days a week basis.

Service

The 13241/Banka–Rajendra Nagar Patna Intercity Express has average speed of 37 km/hr and covers 272 km in 7 h 25 m. The 13242/Rajendra Nagar Patna–Banka Intercity Express has an average speed of 37 km/hr and covers 272 km in 7 h 25 m.

Route and halts 

The important halts of the train are:

 
 Barahat Junction

Coach composition

The train has standard ICF rakes with max speed of 110 kmph. The train consists of 23 coaches :

 1 HA1 (1st AC cum 2A)
 1 2AC
 4 3AC coach
 1 2AC cum 3AC coach
 6 Sleeper coach
 8 General coach
 2 Seating cum Luggage Rake

Traction

Both trains are hauled by a Mughalsarai Loco Shed-based WDM-3A diesel locomotive from Banka to Patna and vice versa.
From 29 to 03-2021 train is hauled by an electric locomotive.

See also 

 Banka Junction railway station
 Rajendra Nagar Terminal railway station
 Sealdah–Varanasi Express
 Malda Town–Patna Express

Notes

References

External links 

 13241/Banka–Rajendra Nagar Patna Express
 13242/Rajendra Nagar Patna–Banka Express

Transport in Patna
Intercity Express (Indian Railways) trains
Rail transport in Bihar